{{Infobox magazine
| title = New Noise Magazine
| logo = New Noise Magazine Logo.png
| logo_size = 
| logo_caption = New Noise Magazine logo
| logo_alt = The logo of New Noise Magazine.
| image_file = New Noise Magazine Issue 26.jpg
| image_size = 
| image_caption = The cover of New Noise Magazines 26th issue (July 2016), illustrated by Chris Shary.
| image_alt = A white magazine cover with black ink drawing of four people.
| editor_title = Editor-in-Chief
| editor = Lisa Root
| editor_title2 = Managing Editor
| editor2 = Addison Herron-Wheeler
| previous_editor = 
| staff_writer = Cheetah Chrome
| photographer = 
| category = Music
| frequency = Bimonthly
| format = A4
| circulation = 8,000
| publisher = Lisa Root
| founder = Lisa Root
| founded = February 2013
| firstdate = 
| finaldate = 
| finalnumber = 
| company = New Noise Magazine, Inc.
| country = United States
| based = Berkeley, California
| language = English
| website = 
}}New Noise Magazine''' is an American music magazine that focuses on artist news, band interviews, album reviews and underground culture. It was founded in February 2013, by Lisa Root, who had previously been the co-founder and editor-in-chief of such publications as AMP Magazine, Loud Fast Rules! Magazine and Hails & Horns Magazine. New Noise Magazine's managing editor, Addison Herron-Wheeler, has written for Decibel, Exclaim!, Invisible Oranges, MetalSucks, Metal Rules, CVLT Nation, San Diego CityBeat, Westword, RVA Magazine, High Times, Culture Magazine and Bust, and is the editor-in-chief and co-owner of Out Front. Musician Cheetah Chrome once wrote a political column for the magazine.

The print magazine is published bimonthly, with eight issues a year; each issue is offered in a choice of multiple different cover arts (two or three variants), and comes with a flexi disc that includes exclusive music content. The first print issue was released in April 2013. New Noise Magazine's website was launched beforehand, on February 21, 2013, and features different coverage from the printed issues.

Some of the magazine's articles have been quoted, re-published or cited in such publications as Chicago Tribune, Pittsburgh Post-Gazette, Star Tribune, The Arizona Republic, The Fresno Bee, The Kansas City Star, Missoula Independent, The Dispatch, Herald News, The Record, and The Rock Island Argus.

 Flexi Collection New Noise Magazine'' has been including free flexi discs, under the Flexi Collection series, for its subscribers since its 23rd issue. Each flexi disc contains previously-unreleased and exclusive material from the cover band. Some issues have included two flexi discs (sometimes two per issue, other times one for each alternative cover), while others have included two bands on a single flexi disc.

References

External links 
 
 

2013 establishments in California
American entertainment news websites
American music websites
Bimonthly magazines published in the United States
Companies based in Berkeley, California
Entertainment companies based in California
Heavy metal publications
Internet properties established in 2013
LGBT-related magazines published in the United States
LGBT-related websites
Magazines established in 2013
Magazines published in the San Francisco Bay Area
Mass media in Berkeley, California
Music magazines published in the United States
Music review websites
Online music magazines published in the United States
Periodicals with audio content
Publishing companies based in Berkeley, California
Punk zines
Privately held companies based in California